is a retired male long-distance runner from Japan, who won the 1993 edition of Amsterdam Marathon, clocking 2:11:56 on September 26, 1993.

Achievements

References

1967 births
Living people
Place of birth missing (living people)
Japanese male long-distance runners
Japanese male marathon runners
Asian Games competitors for Japan
Athletes (track and field) at the 1994 Asian Games
Japan Championships in Athletics winners